Tiger Army III: Ghost Tigers Rise is Tiger Army's third full-length album. It was released by Hellcat Records on June 29, 2004. It takes the psychobilly of their first two efforts and layers it with elements of country, blues and punk to create a more mature and emotional sound than previous works. The focus of the lyrics on the album range from topics of ghosts and vampires to life and love. The album was well received and led to their first U.S. headlining tour in spring of 2005.

Track listing

All songs written and composed by Nick 13

Personnel

Tiger Army
 Nick 13 – Composer
 Geoff Kresge – Mixing,  Standup Bass,  Vocals
 Fred Hell – Drums

Guests and Other
 Greg Leisz – Pedal Steel
 Andrew Alekel – Engineer,  Mixing
 Stevie B – Guitar Technician
 Chad Essig – Assistant Engineer
 Mike Fasano – Drums, Drum Technician
 Gene Grimaldi – Mastering
 Sergie – Graphic Design

References

Tiger Army albums
2004 albums
Epitaph Records albums
Hellcat Records albums